Aegosoma is a genus of long-horned beetles belonging to the family Cerambycidae.

Species
The following species are recognised in the genus Aegosoma:
 Aegosoma annulicorne Komiya, 2001
 Aegosoma cuneicorne Komiya, 2000
 Aegosoma doi Drumont & Ivanov, 2016
 Aegosoma dorei Drumont et al, 2018
 Aegosoma george Do, 2015
 Aegosoma giganteum Lansberge, 1884
 Aegosoma guerryi Lameere, 1915
 Aegosoma hainanense Gahan, 1900
 Aegosoma ivanovi Danilevsky, 2011
 Aegosoma katsurai Komiya, 2000
 Aegosoma kusamai Komiya, 1999
 Aegosoma musaamani Drumont, Do & Bosuang, 2013
 Aegosoma ornaticolle White, 1853
 Aegosoma osseum Aurivillius, 1897
 Aegosoma pallidum Komiya & Drumont, 2012
 Aegosoma pseudornaticolle Ripaille & Drumon,t 2017
 Aegosoma scabricorne Scopoli, 1763
 Aegosoma sinicum White, 1853
 Aegosoma xentoc Do & Drumont, 2014

References

Prioninae